The Bangladesh U-17 national football team is a youth football team operated under the Bangladesh Football Federation. The team would represent Bangladesh in the AFC U-16 Championship, SAFF U-16 Championship and has yet to qualify for the FIFA U-17 World Cup.

Squad
This is the squad which is announced for the 2019 SAFF U-15 Championship

|-
! colspan="9"  style="background:#b0d3fb; text-align:left;"|
|- style="background:#dfedfd;"

|-
! colspan="9"  style="background:#b0d3fb; text-align:left;"|
|- style="background:#dfedfd;"

|-
! colspan="9"  style="background:#b0d3fb; text-align:left;"|
|- style="background:#dfedfd;"

Recent fixtures and results

Since 1986 to present day all matches are updated below in the table.

1986

1992

1998

2000

2003

2004

2005

2006

2011

2013

2015

2017

2018

2019

2022

Competition records

FIFA U-17 World Cup

AFC U-17 Asian Cup

SAFF U-17 Championship

Honours
SAFF U-16 Championship
Winners (2): 2015, 2018
UEFA Assist U-16 Development Tournament
Winners(1): 2019

See also 
Bangladesh national football team
Bangladesh national under-23 football team
Bangladesh national under-20 football team
Bangladesh women's national football team
Bangladesh women's national under-17 football team
Bangladesh women's national under-20 football team

References

External links
 Bangladesh Football Federation

under-17
Asian national under-17 association football teams
Youth football in Bangladesh